This is a List of GP2 Asia Series drivers, that is, a list of drivers who have made at least one race entry in the GP2 Asia Series from 2008 onwards. The list is accurate up to and including the end of the 2011 season.

By name

By nationality

Footnotes

See also
List of GP2 Series drivers

GP2 Asia Series
Gp2 Asia Series drivers